The Ruahine is a mountain range in the North Island of New Zealand.

Ruahine may also refer to:

 Ruahine (New Zealand electorate), a former New Zealand parliamentary electorate
 Ruahine Albert, a New Zealand anti-domestic violence activist
 , a passenger ship built in 1950
 , a steamship built in 1891
 , a passenger ship built in 1909
 Ruahine Fault, a geological fault in the North Island Fault System, New Zealand

See also
 Ngāruahine, a Māori iwi located in South Taranaki, North Island, New Zealand